Kelich Kola (also Romanized as Kelīch Kolā; also known as Kelīj Kolā) is a village in Farim Rural District, Dodangeh District, Sari County, Mazandaran Province, Iran. At the 2006 census, its population was 48, in 14 families.

References 

Populated places in Sari County